The membership of Mexican Professional Baseball Hall of Fame includes 207 individuals through 2020.  The first members were inducted in 1939, followed by selections in 1964, and since 1971 by elections in most of the following years.  Members are listed below with their year of selection, field position or other area of accomplishment, and nationality.

List of members

References

External links
 Official site

Mexican Professional Baseball Hall Of Fame
Baseball in Mexico
Lists of baseball players
Mex